Kanke is a Local Government Area in Plateau State, Nigeria. Its headquarters is in the town of Kwal.

It has an area of 926 km and a population of 121,424 at the 2006 census. Majority of populations are the Angas - 95%, with the remaining 5% Taroh, Borghum, and Siyawa. Nigeria's former president, Yakubu Gowon is from the Kanke LGA.

The postal code of the area is 933.

References

Kanke Resort
Along Barkin Kabwir, Kangke LGA
Pankshin-Barakin Ladi Rd
Pankshin

Local Government Areas in Plateau State